Melissa Greenspan is an American actress known for her recurring roles as Kim on Providence and as Cindy on the Desperate Housewives. She also appeared in Party of Five, Saved by the Bell: The New Class, Beverly Hills 90210, Charmed, Parenthood and many more.

Filmography

Television 
 1996-1999 Disney's Doug as Sally, Briar Langolier, Cassandra Bleem (voices) (unknown episodes) 
 1997 Boston Common as Photo Assistant (1 episode) 
 1997 Party of Five as Joette (3 episodes) 
 1997 Saved by the Bell: The New Class as Ernestine (2 episodes) 
 1999 Beverly Hills 90210 as Zoe (1 episode) 
 1999 3rd Rock from the Sun as The Maid (1 episode) 
 2000 Diagnosis Murder as Ellie Rose (2 episodes)  
 2002 Providence as Kim (5 episodes) 
 2003 Charmed as Flo (1 episode) 
 2010 $#*! My Dad Says as Announcer (1 episode) 
 2011 Paul the Male Matchmaker as Tina (1 episode) 
 2011 Man Up as Vicki Barker (1 episode) 
 2011 Desperate Housewives as Cindy (4 episodes) 
 2012 Parenthood as Val Watson (2 episodes)
 2014 Kirby Buckets as Ms. Statsky (1 episode)
 2015 NCIS as Mother (1 episode)
 2016 Good Girls Revolt as Shira (2 episodes)
 2017 How to Beat Your Sister-in-Law (at everything) as Melissa (12 episodes)
 2020 Modern Family as Debra (1 episode)
 2021 The Way of the Househusband as Hibari Torii (voice) (4 episodes)

Film
 1997 Laws of Deception as Hostess 
 1998 Life Is a Sweet as Unknown
 1998 Matter of Trust as Sara
 1999 Doug's 1st Movie (voice) as Briar Langolier
 2000 Diamond Men as Krystal 
 2000 Enemies of Laughter as Young Woman
 2002 Repli-Kate as Brandi 
 2002 The Wild Thornberrys Movie as Sarah Wellington (voice)
 2005 A Distant Thunder as Female Announcer On Radio
 2006 Final Move as Kathy Briggs
 2006 Boyfriend as Partygoer
 2009 Curious George 2: Follow That Monkey! as Phone Operator (voice)
 2021 Senior Moment as Officer Nancy

Video games
 2007 Spider-Man 3 as Additional Voices
 2013 Grand Theft Auto V as The Local Population

References

External links
 

Living people
American film actresses
American stage actresses
American television actresses
American video game actresses
American voice actresses
Place of birth missing (living people)
Year of birth missing (living people)